Héctor da Rosa is an Argentine actor.

Filmography
1968 Rafael Heredia El Gitano (TV series) as Hermano Menor 
1968 Palo y hueso as Domingo
1971 Argentino hasta la muerte
1971 A Bravo of the 1900s
1971 The Big Highway
1974 Contigo y aquí
1975 Tu rebelde ternura (TV series)
1979 Contragolpe
1980 Rosa... de lejos (TV series) as Ramon Ramos
1992 Micaela (TV series) as Lorenzo
1997 Rich and Famous (TV series)
1998 Endless Summer (TV series) as Fisherman
2000 Un amor de Borges
2003 Forever Julia (TV series) as Bruzzone
2008 Vidas robadas (TV series) as Alberto
2009 Dromo (TV mini-series)

References

20th-century Argentine male actors
21st-century Argentine male actors

Argentine male television actors
Living people
Place of birth missing (living people)
Year of birth missing (living people)